Łukasz Zwoliński (born 24 February 1993) is a Polish professional footballer who plays as a forward for Lechia Gdańsk.

Career
In February 2020, he joined Lechia Gdańsk on a three-and-a-half-year contract.

Career statistics

Club

References

External links

1993 births
Living people
Sportspeople from Szczecin
Polish footballers
Poland youth international footballers
Association football forwards
Ekstraklasa players
I liga players
Croatian Football League players
Arka Gdynia players
Górnik Łęczna players
Pogoń Szczecin players
Śląsk Wrocław players
HNK Gorica players
Lechia Gdańsk players
Expatriate footballers in Croatia
Polish expatriates in Croatia